Pupisoma dioscoricola is a species of gastropods belonging to the family Valloniidae.  

Subspecies:
 Pupisoma dioscoricola dioscoricola (C. B. Adams, 1845)
 Pupisoma dioscoricola insigne Pilsbry, 1920

Distribution
The species has almost cosmopolitan distribution. This species occurs in the United States of America (Florida and Texas) to south Brazil and north Argentina. Some of this distribution could be anthropogenic (Hausdsdorf 2007). It is also found in Micronesia, but one broken specimen was found in Afghanistan in 1979.

Its natural habitats are temperate forests and subtropical or tropical dry shrubland. It is threatened by habitat loss.

References

 Schalie, H. van der. (1948). The land and fresh-water mollusks of Puerto Rico. Museum of Zoology, University of Michigan, Miscellaneous Publications. no. 70: 1-134. (Ann Arbor).
 Holyoak, D. T.; Holyoak, G. A.; Lima, R. F. D.; Panisi, M.; Sinclair, F. (2020). A checklist of the land Mollusca (Gastropoda) of the islands of São Tomé and Príncipe, with new records and descriptions of new taxa. Iberus: Revista de la Sociedad Española de Malacología, (Iberus).38(2): 219-319.
 Fischer-Piette, E., C. P. Blanc, F. Blanc, & F. Salvat (1994). Gastéropodes terrestres pulmonés. Faune de Madagascar, 83: 1-552.

External links
 Adams, C. B. (1845). Specierum novarum conchyliorum, in Jamaica repertorum, synopsis. Proceedings of the Boston Society of Natural History. 2: 1-17.
 Morelet, A. (1851). Testacea novissima insulae Cubanae et Americae Centralis, Pars II. Paris: Baillière. 30 pp.
 Guppy, R. J. L. (1868). Further additions to the catalogue of the land and freshwater Molluska of Trinidad. Proceedings of the Scientific Association of Trinidad. 1(5):237-245
 Benson, W. H. (1850). Characters of new species of Helix from India, Mauritius and the Cape of Good Hope; also of a new Mauritian Tornatellina, with remarks on the habits of a Cape Succinea. Annals and Magazine of Natural History. (2) 6: 251–256
 Mollendorff, O. F. von. (1888). Von den Philippinen. V. Nachrichtsblatt der deutschen Malakozoologischen Gesellschaft. 20 (7/8): 97 - 109
 Miquel, S. E.; Herrera, H. W. (2014). Catalogue of terrestrial gastropods from Galápagos (except Bulimulidae and Succineidae) with description of a new species of Ambrosiella Odhner (Achatinellidae) (Mollusca: Gastropoda). Archiv für Molluskenkunde. 143(2): 107-133
 Espinosa, J. A. & Robinson, D. G. (2021). Annotated checklist of the terrestrial mollusks (Mollusca: Gastropoda) from Hispaniola Island. Novitates Caribaea. 17: 71–146
 Hausdorf, B. (2007). Revision of the American Pupisoma species (Gastropoda: Pupilloidea). Journal of Natural History. 41(21-24): 1481-1511.

Valloniidae
Gastropods described in 1845